Nikolay Rumyantsev (born 31 May 1930) is a Soviet former long-distance runner. He competed in the marathon at the 1960 Summer Olympics.

References

External links
  

1930 births
Possibly living people
Athletes (track and field) at the 1960 Summer Olympics
Soviet male long-distance runners
Soviet male marathon runners
Olympic athletes of the Soviet Union
Sportspeople from Samara, Russia